Silesitidae is an ammonite family in the superfamily Desmoceratoidea. They lived during the Cretaceous, in the Barremian age.

Genera
 Neoastieria
 Piatnitzkyceras
 Silesites
 Silesitoidinae

Distribution
Fossils of species within this genus have been found in the Cretaceous sediments of Antarctica, France, Hungary, Italy, Mexico, Morocco, Slovakia, Spain.

References

Early Cretaceous first appearances
Late Cretaceous extinctions
Desmoceratoidea
Ammonitida families